Baileya levitans, the pale baileya, is a species of nolid moth in the family Nolidae. It was described by Smith in 1906 and is found in North America.

The MONA or Hodges number for Baileya levitans is 8972.

References

 Lafontaine, J. Donald & Schmidt, B. Christian (2010). "Annotated check list of the Noctuoidea (Insecta, Lepidoptera) of North America north of Mexico". ZooKeys. vol. 40, 1-239.

Further reading

 Arnett, Ross H. (2000). American Insects: A Handbook of the Insects of America North of Mexico. CRC Press.

External links

 Butterflies and Moths of North America

Nolidae